Norton Rose Fulbright (NRF) is a British-American multinational law firm. It is the second-largest law firm in the United States and one of the ten largest in the world, by both lawyers and revenue. In 2017–18, Norton Rose Fulbright had total revenue of US$2.1 billion.

It has more than 7,000 people including 3,000 lawyers and other legal staff in more than 50 offices based in Europe, the United States, Canada, Latin America, Asia, Australia, Africa, and the Middle East.  

The firm was formed in 2013 by the merger of the British law firm Norton Rose and the American law firm Fulbright & Jaworski.

History 
The origin of Norton Rose dates back to 1794 when the sole practitioner Robert Charsley opened for business. In 1821, Charsley formed a partnership with William Barker, creating Charsley & Barker. Later that century, Phillip Rose (later Sir Philip Rose) joined the firm, creating Barker & Rose. In the years that followed, a new partnership between Phillip Rose and Henry Elland Norton was formed under the name Barker, Rose & Norton. By the turn of the 20th century, the firm was called Norton, Rose, Norton & Co., and had maintained its position as a powerful force in the City of London for six decades.

In 1960, the firm, by then renamed Norton, Rose & Co., amalgamated with specialist shipping firm Botterell & Roche (founded 1861) to form Norton, Rose, Botterell & Roche. With its expertise in shipping, the firm benefited from the growth of the international shipping market in the early 1960s and was involved in the nationalization of British Steel and the after-arrangement of its subsidiary companies.

The firm continued to grow, and in 1976 established its first international office in Hong Kong, followed by Bahrain in 1979 and Singapore in 1982. By 1988, the firm had shortened its name and over the next ten years Norton Rose commenced a programme of international expansion with the establishment of offices across Asia, Europe and the Middle East, taking the firm's international operations to 22 offices. In 2007, Norton Rose converted to a Limited Liability Partnership.

Norton Rose embarked on the first phase of a rapid expansion when it combined with Australian firm Deacons in 2010, adding to the strength and size of the firm across the Asia-Pacific region. In early 2011, Norton Rose Australia announced an association with Indonesia firm Susandarini & Partners.

Significant dates
By June 2011, Norton Rose had combined with Canadian law firm Ogilvy Renault and South African firm Deneys Reitz, creating a top 10 global legal practice with 38 offices and 2500 legal staff, totalling more than 5000 people worldwide. The combination was followed by the opening of new offices in Europe and Africa.

In January 2012, a combination with Canadian firm Macleod Dixon made Norton Rose Group one of the largest law firms in Canada.

On 3 June 2013, Norton Rose combined with Fulbright & Jaworski to become Norton Rose Fulbright, establishing a market leading presence in the United States and a global law firm with 3800 lawyers and legal staff, and a worldwide headcount of more than 7000 people.

In January 2014, Norton Rose Fulbright signed a deal with McLaren as a corporate partner and as a global legal advisor to the McLaren Group for 5 years.

Announced in September 2016, the firm combined with the 126-year-old Vancouver firm Bull Housser in January 2017, a move considered indicative of both legal firm globalization and the emergence of British Columbia as a legal international hub, as well as being a strategic move by the firm to enter the Vancouver market and effectively complete the firm's Canadian footprint. At the time of the merger announcement, Bull Housser (aka Bull, Housser & Tupper LLC) had about 90 lawyers on staff.

In June 2017 Norton Rose Fulbright combined with Chadbourne & Parke, strengthening its market-leading presence in the United States and growing the global firm to more than 4000 lawyers.

In December 2017, Norton Rose Fulbright combined with leading Australian firm, Henry Davis York.

In August 2020, Gerry Pecht was elected as Global Chief Executive.

References

External links 
 Norton Rose Fulbright
 Firm's rankings: Chambers and Partners Global; Legal 500 UK; Legal 500 EMEA; Legal 500 Asia Pacific; Legal 500 United States; Legal 500 Latin America; Chambers and Partners Student Guide.

Law firms of England
Law firms of Singapore
Law firms of Bahrain
Law firms based in London
Law firms established in 1794
Foreign law firms with offices in Hong Kong
Foreign law firms with offices in Japan
Foreign law firms with offices in the Netherlands
1794 establishments in England
Law firms of Australia
Law firms of Switzerland